Kosmos 2483 ( meaning Cosmos 2483) is a  Russian military store-dump communications satellite launched in 2013, together with Kosmos 2484 and Kosmos 2482.

This satellite is a Strela-3M/Rodnik satellite, a modification of the civilian Gonets satellites.

Kosmos 2483 was launched from site 133/3 at Plesetsk Cosmodrome in northern Russia. A rokot carrier rocket with a Briz-KM upper stage was used to perform the launch which took place at 16:24 UTC on 15 January 2013. The launch successfully placed the satellite into low Earth orbit. It subsequently received its Kosmos designation, and the international designator 2013-001B. The United States Space Command assigned it the Satellite Catalog Number 39058.

The launch was postponed from 8 December 2012 and was the first launch of a Rokot since the 28 July 2012 launch of Kosmos 2481, another Rodnik.

See also

List of Kosmos satellites (2251–2500)

References

Spacecraft launched in 2013
Spacecraft launched by Rokot rockets
Kosmos satellites